Enemies: The President, Justice and the FBI is a four-part documentary television series by Showtime about the history of the relationship between U.S. presidents and the Federal Bureau of Investigation, inspired by Tim Weiner's book Enemies: A History of the FBI.

References

2018 in American television
Federal Bureau of Investigation